Kevin Mitchell may refer to:

Sports
 Kevin Mitchell (Australian rules footballer) (born 1945), Australian footballer
 Kevin Mitchell (baseball) (born 1962), American baseball player and 1989 National League MVP
 Kevin Mitchell (boxer) (born 1984), English boxer
 Kevin Mitchell (ice hockey) (born 1980), American professional ice hockey player
 Kevin Mitchell (linebacker) (1971–2007), NFL football player
 Kevin Mitchell (motorcyclist) (born 1961), former British Grand Prix motorcycle road racer
 Kevin Mitchell (safety) (born 1985), currently a free agent in the National Football League
 Kevin Mitchell (water polo) (born 1981), Canadian water polo player

Other
 Kevin Mitchell (musician), lead singer of Australian rock band Jebediah, also known as Bob Evans